The City of Norwich, England, as of 2011, had 23 parks, 95 open spaces and 59 natural areas in the care of the local authority.

Historic parks

The four Grade II listed historic parks were purpose built in the 1920s and 1930s under the direction of Parks Superintendent Captain Sandys-Winsch. His designs included buildings, structures and hard landscaping which are finished in a modernist pre-cast concrete, with unemployed men providing much of the labour. By the late 1990s many of the structures had fallen into disrepair. A successful application to the Heritage Lottery Fund enabled major refurbishment to the four main parks.

Heigham Park  is located in the city's Golden Triangle district and opened in 1924. Amenities include a children's playground, bowling green, playing field, tennis courts and a small pond. Specimen beech including several copper beech trees form a boundary around much of the park. In addition, there are herbaceous borders, shrubberies and a wisteria covered concrete pergola which was part of the original design.
Wensum Park  was completed in 1925. The riverside park features many mature trees, flower beds, picnic area, children's playground and paddling pool and still retains Captain Sandys-Winsch's concrete pavilion and architecture. As part of the city's millennium celebrations a labyrinth was installed in the centre of the park.
The flagship park was opened by the Prince of Wales in 1928. Several of Sandys-Winsch's structures remain including the central rotunda, bandstand, model boating pond and lily pond. The park offers a wide range of sporting facilities.
Waterloo Park  is located to the north of the city centre and enveloped between Angel Road and Aylsham Road A1024. Covering  the park was opened in 1933 and boasts one of the largest herbaceous borders in a UK public park. Other amenities include a refurbished paddling pool (2011), children's playground, playing field, tennis courts and bowling green. Many of the original architectural features remain including the pavilion, bandstand and hard landscaping.

Parks
Listed below are a selection of the city's parks. Many date back to 1920s and 1930s.

Chapelfield Gardens  is located in central Norwich. At its time of opening in 1880 it was one of the few public open spaces in the city centre. The park is named after the Chapel of St Mary and has always been an open space. Today (2011) facilities include a restaurant, bandstand, children's playground, pétanque court, giant chess and draughts table. Different events are hosted in the park including bandstand concerts, annual music festival and travelling funfairs. Over 190 trees representing 45 native and foreign species can be found as well as many shrubs and flower beds.
Earlham Hall Park was bought by the local authority in 1925, part of which became the site for the University of East Anglia. Contained within the park is Earlham Hall its outbuildings and formal gardens. The open park area can be hired for public events.
Facilities include a cycle speedway track, bowling green, five-a-side football pitch and children's play area. Also contained within the park is Harford Community Centre community centre.
Facilities in the park include an adventure playground and a floodlight sports court.
Mile Cross Gardens  are two identical shaped gardens located at the junction of Suckling Avenue and the Aylsham Road. The listed Grade II gardens were laid out to a design by Sandys-Winsch and contain some original features and were opened in May 1929. Today (2013) the south garden is kept as a wildlife friendly area and the northern garden is a children's playground.
The open grassed area features a small children's playground. In April 2011, the park became the city's first eco-park with funding from the Big Lottery Fund and support from local schools and the community.
The sloping south-facing park contains a children's play area, mature trees and has a close historical connection to the family of Anna Sewell, author of Black Beauty.
The park was officially opened in 1929 and was built as part of an unemployment alleviation scheme. The large, square, functional park features several football pitches, a children's playground and an all-weather sports court. Located close to its boundary with Marriott's Way part of the National Cycle Route 1 is the Sloughbottom Park BMX course. Of architectural interest is the Sandys-Winsch pavilion which is currently used as a dressing room for sports people.

Open spaces
Listed below are the local nature reserves and the Site of Special Scientific Interest located within the city boundaries.

Local nature reserves

Covering  of low-lying unimproved grassland which is crossed by a network of drainage ditches. The site lies adjacent to the River Yare and can be reached by public footpaths. Horses graze the site throughout the year.
Tree species including oak, sycamore, ash and lime have colonised the site. Flora including snowdrops, arum lily, bluebell and a variety of woodland birds have been recorded at the reserve.
Earlham Park Woods  is located on the edge of Earlham Park and is also known as Violet Grove and the Heronry. Covering  the reserve has a diverse range of habitat including dense tall marsh, unimproved neutral grassland, woodland and a pond which has been dredged creating open water.
Covering  of largely neutral grassland with small areas of tall herb and some broad-leaved woodland. The reserve is grazed by cattle in the summer months.
The wood which was mentioned in the Domesday Book of 1086 contains many mature trees, especially sycamore and oak. Other species present are chestnut, beech, hornbeam and birch. Flora including bluebells and a range of woodland birds including jay and green woodpecker have been recorded.
The reserve comprises a flood plain which is grazed by cattle bounded by the River Yare. Numerous dykes bisect the site which are managed rotationally. Small areas of damp woodland and five wildlife ponds can be found. Good marsh flora including orchids have been recorded. Footpaths link the reserve to Eaton Common and Danby Wood.
Formerly heathland, the reserve is mostly given over to broad-leaved semi-natural woodland with a few pockets of heath remaining. Species of interest include heather, lizards and woodland birds. A number of sports pitches are contained within the site.
Both reserves are linked by public footpaths. The reserve has a wide range of habitat including woodland, meadows, riverbank and marshes.

Site of Special Scientific Interest
Sweetbriar Road Meadows  is a SSSI covering . It consists of a series of unimproved water-meadows which support a diverse range of habitat. The site is privately owned with no public right of way, but can be viewed from public paths which bound the site.

Gardens
The following privately owned gardens open to the public occasionally in aid of charity.

The Bear Shop  is a small, riverside garden to the rear of a 15th-century house (Today, retail premises) in the Elm Hill area of Norwich. Considered to be based on a design by Gertrude Jekyll, the well stocked garden features many herbaceous plants and topiary.
The Bishop's House  garden is located within the grounds of Norwich Cathedral. Covering , the walled garden dating back to the 12th century holds many rare and unusual shrubs and trees. Other features include rose beds, herbaceous borders, kitchen garden and a meadow labyrinth.

Listed below are gardens open regularly to the public.

Grapes Hill Community Garden  is a small city centre garden close to the Norwich Inner Ring road. Created from a disused, tarmaced play area, it was officially opened in 2011. The garden is tended by volunteers and contains a large number of edible plants together with a wide choice of wild and woodland flowers, grasses, shrubs and trees. Raised beds, with access for wheelchair users and individuals to grow vegetables are available for hire.
Plantation Garden  is a Victorian city centre garden adjacent to St John the Baptist Cathedral. Planting includes summer and winter bedding shrubs and trees.

Further reading

References

External links
George Plunkett's photos of parks and gardens

 
Norwich
Parks
Norwich
Gardens in Norfolk
Parks
Norwich